Florence Wycherley (20 February 1908 – 23 April 1969) was an Irish politician. A farmer by trade, he first stood for election to Dáil Éireann as a Clann na Talmhan candidate at the 1954 general election for Cork West but was not elected. He was elected to the Dáil as an independent Teachta Dála (TD) for Cork West at the 1957 general election. He lost his seat at the 1961 general election.

He was the father of actor Don Wycherley.

References

1908 births
1969 deaths
Independent TDs
Clann na Talmhan politicians
Members of the 16th Dáil
Politicians from County Cork
Irish farmers